Philip (died 306 BC), son of Antigonus, king of Asia, was sent by his father in 310 BC, at the head of an army, to oppose the revolt of his general Phoenix, and to recover possession of the towns on the Hellespont held by the latter. He died in 306 BC, just as Antigonus was setting out for his expedition against Egypt.

References
Smith, William (editor); Dictionary of Greek and Roman Biography and Mythology, "Philippus (17)", Boston, (1867)

Notes

Ancient Macedonian generals
Ancient Elimiotes
Year of birth unknown
306 BC deaths
Antigonus I Monophthalmus
Antigonid dynasty